Onward Indonesia Coalition (abbrev: KIM) is an official political coalition in Indonesia to support the presidential/vice presidential candidates Joko Widodo and Ma'ruf Amin in the 2019 presidential election. Previously, this coalition was named as the Working Indonesia Coalition, founded in 2018. Currently, the coalition is used as the government of President Joko Widodo.

History 

On 9 August 2018, Joko Widodo established the Working Indonesia Coalition to compete against Prabowo Subianto's Just and Prosperous Indonesia Coalition consisting of the Great Indonesia Movement Party, the Prosperous Justice Party, the National Mandate Party, the Democratic Party, Berkarya Party and Idaman Party during the 2019 presidential election. Formation of the coalition was carried out in the declaration at Plataran Restaurant, Menteng, Central Jakarta. This continued the previous coalition, the Great Indonesia Coalition by Megawati Sukarnoputri.

Joko Widodo also formed his team to win himself as a presidential candidate named the National Campaign Team led by Erick Thohir. It was agreed that Ma'ruf Amin would be a candidate for vice president against Sandiaga Uno. Jokowi and Ma'ruf started registering their candidacy on 10 August 2018 together with the leaders of the coalition political parties. Jokowi wore a shirt that reads "Bersih, Merakyat, Kerja Nyata" and departed from the Joang '45 Building to the General Elections Commission Building.

On 21 October 2019, Joko Widodo offered Gerindra to join his coalition. Then, he entered the names Prabowo Subianto and Edhy Prabowo as ministers in his cabinet. Gerindra Party officially joined the coalition on 23 October 2019. This was a disappointment for the people who had supported Prabowo as a presidential candidate. the National Mandate Party followed Gerindra to join the coalition on 25 August 2021.

Member parties

Leadership structure 

 Chairman: 
 Joko Widodo (PDI-P)
 Leadership Council:
 Megawati Sukarnoputri (PDI-P)
 Airlangga Hartarto (Golkar)
 Prabowo Subianto Djojohadikusumo (Gerindra)
 Surya Paloh (Nasdem)
 Muhaimin Iskandar (PKB)
 Zulkifli Hasan (PAN)
 Suharso Monoarfa (PPP)
 Hary Tanoesoedibjo (Perindo)
 Giring Ganesha (PSI)
 Oesman Sapta Odang (Hanura)
 Yusril Ihza Mahendra (PBB)
 Yussuf Solichien (PKP)
 Secretariat Council:
 Hasto Kristiyanto (PDI-P)
 Lodewijk Freidrich Paulus (Golkar)
 Ahmad Muzani (Gerindra)
 Johnny Gerard Plate (Nasdem)
 Hasanuddin Wahid (PKB)
 Eddy Soeparno (PAN)
 Arwani Thomafi (PPP)
 Ahmad Rofiq (Perindo)
 Dea Tunggaesti (PSI)
 Kodrat Shah (Hanura)
 Afriansyah Noor (PBB)
 Syahrul Mamma (PKP)

General election results

Controversies

Extending presidential term and postponing general election 
PKB chairman Muhaimin Iskandar proposes postponing the 2024 general election and invites the leaders of coalition political parties with reasons for economic recovery. He said that the general election should be postponed a year or two after the presidential term ends on 2024. This statement was reinforced by the coordinating minister Luhut Binsar Panjaitan who claimed the existence of big data containing 110 million netizens who support the postponement of the election. PAN's Zulkifli Hasan and Golkar's Airlangga Hartarto said the same thing as Muhaimin said. They continued to urge all coalition party leaders to fulfill their wishes even though several political parties, such as PDIP, Gerindra, Nasdem and PPP, refused to postpone the election. Despite refusing to postpone the election, PSI is trying to push for an extension of the presidential term by supporting Jokowi's return as president.

Facing increasingly heated issues, President Joko Widodo stressed to his ministers not to make controversial statements related to postponing elections and extending the presidential term. In cabinet, the ministers who proposed this were Bahlil Lahadalia, Luhut Binsar Panjaitan and Airlangga Hartarto. The population responded to their statements by holding large-scale demonstrations.

References 

Political party alliances in Indonesia
Political parties established in 2018